Léon Dostert (May 14, 1904 – September 1, 1971) was a French-born American scholar of languages and a pivotal proponent of machine translation. He was responsible for enduring innovations in interpretation, such as the simultaneous, head-set method used at the Nuremberg Trials, which is still used today at international gatherings and international institutions like the United Nations, the Council of Europe, the European Commission and the European Parliament.

Early life and education 
Born in Longwy, France, at the beginning of the twentieth century, Dostert's foreign-language capabilities became apparent during a childhood affected by World War I. His village on the Belgian border was overrun by the German army during that conflagration before being liberated by its American counterpart, and Dostert had mastered both German and English before the end of hostilities. Such was his command of both languages, he worked as a translator for both the Germans and the Americans.

Orphaned before the outbreak of war, Dostert was well liked by the American troops he worked for – so much so, in fact, that a few of them sponsored his education in the United States after the war. In 1921, after recovering from war-related ill-health, Dostert enrolled in a high school in Pasadena, California. He entered Occidental College in 1925, before moving to Georgetown University a few years later, where in 1928 he gained a BS in foreign service. Another bachelor's degree, in philosophy, followed in 1930, and a master's in 1931. Dostert was accepted as a PhD student in languages at Johns Hopkins, though he never finished his thesis.

Wartime service 

Dostert was responsible for translation at the Nuremberg Trials.

Machine translation 
Dostert became the inaugural head of Georgetown's Institute of Languages and Linguistics. The Institute would collaborate with IBM to perform the first ever machine translation, which was publicly demonstrated in 1954.
Dostert himself announced the achievement, though the public event itself was more a proof of concept to garner further interest and resources.

Notes

Bibliography 

1904 births
1971 deaths
French emigrants to the United States
Linguists from the United States
Walsh School of Foreign Service alumni
People from Longwy
Johns Hopkins University alumni
20th-century American translators
20th-century linguists
Machine translation researchers